Cayambe may refer to:
 Cayambe (volcano), a stratovolcano in the Central Cordillera of the Ecuadorian Andes
 Cayambe (canton seat), a town located at the foot of the volcano
 Cayambe (canton), a canton governed from the town